The water polo Competitions at the 2014 Central American and Caribbean Games took place at the Leyes de Reforma Aquatics Centre in Veracruz, Mexico from November 22 to 29. There were two competitions, one each for men and women, seven national teams competed in the men's tournament, while five contested the women's event. The top 3 teams (affiliated to the Central American and Caribbean Swimming Federation) in each tournament qualifies to compete at the 2015 Pan American Games in Toronto, Canada.

Medal summary

Medal table

Men's tournament

Preliminary round

Fifth place match

Final round

Bronze medal match

Gold medal match

Women's tournament

Preliminary round

Final round

Semifinals

Bronze medal match

Gold medal match

References

2014 Central American and Caribbean Games events
2014 in water polo
2014
Qualification tournaments for the 2015 Pan American Games